Brigitte Klinz  (born 4 May 1962) is a German footballer who played for the Germany women's national football team from 1982 to 1985, playing 8 matches. On club level she played for SSG 09 Bergisch Gladbach.

References

External links
 
 Profile at soccerdonna.de

1962 births
Living people
German women's footballers
Place of birth missing (living people)
Germany women's international footballers
Women's association football defenders